Younes Bnou Marzouk (born 2 March 1996) is a professional footballer who plays as a forward for Romanian club Rapid București. Born in France with Moroccan origins, he represented both nations at youth international levels.

Club career

Juventus and loans 
Having been raised in the youth sector of Metz, Bnou Marzouk joined Juventus' youth team in 2013 for €500,000. Following two seasons with the Primavera (under-19) team, in August 2015 he was loaned to Westerlo in Belgium. In January 2016, Bnou Marzouk was again loaned out, joining Angers II, before moving to Swiss club FC Chiasso in January 2017 on loan, with whom he scored 12 goals in 18 appearances.

Lugano and loans 
In June 2017, Bnou Marzouk was bought outright by FC Lugano. He was loaned to Dalkurd FF, a newly promoted team in the Swedish Allsvenskan, in January 2018.

Style of play 
Bnou Marzouk is a fast forward with good individual technique physical presence.

References

External links
 
 
 
 
 

1996 births
Living people
People from Freyming-Merlebach
Sportspeople from Moselle (department)
French sportspeople of Moroccan descent
Moroccan footballers
French footballers
Footballers from Grand Est 
Association football forwards
Morocco youth international footballers
France youth international footballers
FC Metz players
Juventus F.C. players
K.V.C. Westerlo players
Angers SCO players
FC Chiasso players
FC Lugano players
Dalkurd FF players
Sliema Wanderers F.C. players
FC Rapid București players
Swiss Challenge League players
Swiss Super League players
Allsvenskan players
Maltese Premier League players
Liga I players
Moroccan expatriate footballers
Moroccan expatriate sportspeople in Italy
Moroccan expatriate sportspeople in Belgium
Moroccan expatriate sportspeople in Switzerland
Moroccan expatriate sportspeople in Sweden
Moroccan expatriate sportspeople in Malta
Moroccan expatriate sportspeople in Romania
French expatriate footballers
French expatriate sportspeople in Italy
French expatriate sportspeople in Belgium
French expatriate sportspeople in Switzerland
French expatriate sportspeople in Sweden
French expatriate sportspeople in Malta
French expatriate sportspeople in Romania
Expatriate footballers in Italy
Expatriate footballers in Belgium
Expatriate footballers in Switzerland
Expatriate footballers in Sweden
Expatriate footballers in Malta
Expatriate footballers in Romania